Strümpell may refer to:

Adolf Strümpell (1853–1925), German neurologist who was born at Neu-Autz Estate, Courland Governorate
Ludwig Strümpell (1812–1899), German philosopher and pedagogue

See also
Strümpell's sign, clinical sign in which the patient's attempt to flex the knee against resistance elicits an extensor plantar reflex